Gishan (also Romanized as Gīshān; also known as Bīshān Takht, Gīshān-e Sharqī, and Gīshān Takht) is a village in Takht Rural District, Takht District, Bandar Abbas County, Hormozgan Province, Iran. At the 2006 census, its population was 131, in 36 families.

References 

Populated places in Bandar Abbas County